Events in the year 1538 in Norway.

Incumbents
Monarch: Christian III

Events
Christian III starts a mining project in Telemark.

Arts and literature

Births

Jens Nilssøn, bishop (died 1600).
Enno Brandrøk, nobleman, mercenary and adventurer (died 1571).
Laurentius Nicolai, Jesuit, active in service of the Counter-Reformation (died 1622).

Deaths
 7 February – Olav Engelbrektsson, Archbishop of Norway (born c. 1480).

See also

References